Glanton is a surname. Notable people with the surname include:

 Adarius Glanton (born 1990), American football player
 De'Mon Glanton (born 1986), American football player
 John Joel Glanton (1819–1850), American soldier and outlaw
 Mike Glanton (born 1960), American politician
 Willie Stevenson Glanton (1923–2017), American lawyer and politician

English-language surnames